London Session(s) or The London Session(s) may refer to:

Music
The London Session Orchestra, under leader Gavyn Wright

Albums
The London Sessions (Mel Tormé album), a re-issue of Tormé: A New Album (1977)
The London Sessions, by Georges Delerue Frank Fitzpatrick (1990)
The London Sessions, recording sessions by The Blackeyed Susans, released as the EP ...Depends On What You Mean By Love (1991)
The London Sessions, by Tim Rose (2004)
The London Session, by Benjamin Herman (2006)
London Sessions (LCD Soundsystem album) (2010)
The London Session, by Bobby Worth (2011)
The London Sessions (Mary J. Blige album) (2014)
The London Session, by Umphrey's McGee (2015)
The London Sessions (Tiësto album) (2020)

See also
 The London Howlin' Wolf Sessions, by Howlin' Wolf (1971)
 Love God, Love People: The London Sessions, by Israel Houghton (2010)